Nagoszewo  is a village in the administrative district of Gmina Ostrów Mazowiecka, within Ostrów Mazowiecka County, Masovian Voivodeship, in east-central Poland.

On 3 June 1863, during the January Uprising, the Battle of Nagoszewo took place near the village, which was then part of Congress Poland. After the battle, Russian troops murdered more than 100 villagers. A memorial in their honor was unveiled in 1917 after that area rejoined Poland.

References

Nagoszewo